Marion May Campbell (born 1948) is a contemporary Australian novelist and academic.

Biography
Marion May Campbell was born in Sydney, New South Wales, 1948. Campbell earned a BA in French Literature studying first at the University of New South Wales and completing her degree at the University of Western Australia. She then pursued post-graduate study at Aix en Provence, writing a dissertation on the work of Stéphane Mallarmé and completed a PhD in Literary Studies and Creative Writing at Victoria University in 2011.

Campbell's novels explore professional and personal relationships between women and literary theoretical concerns, often in a non-standard 'experimental' writing style. In addition to novels her work includes short fiction, poetry, and essays and reviews for journals.  For the stage, Campbell has written the musical theatre piece Dr Memory in the Dream Home which was first performed in 1990 and an adaption of Not Being Miriam entitled Ariadne's Understudies in 1991.

In 2013, Campbell was appointed Associate Professor of Professional and Creative Writing at Deakin University. Campbell has previously coordinated the creative writing program at the University of Melbourne.

Awards
 Shortlisted twice for the Canada-Australia Prize
 1998 – winner of the Western Australian Premier's Book Awards for Not being Miriam
 1999 – shortlisted for the Western Australian Premier's Book Awards for Prowler
 2006 – shortlisted for the Western Australian Premier's Book Awards for Shadow Thief

Selected works

Novels

Prowler (Fremantle Arts Centre, 1999) 
Shadow Thief (Pandanus, 2006) 
Konkretion (University of Western Australia Press, 2013)

Performance writing
Dr Memory in the Dream Home (PICA, 1990)
Ariadne's Understudies (PICA, 1992)
The Half-Life of Creonite (not yet performed)

Poetry 

 Languish (Upswell, 2022)

Memoir
 The Man on the Mantlepiece (University of Western Australia Press, 2018)

Notes

References
Marion M Campbell at University of Melbourne (Retrieved 14 September 2007)
Marion M Campbell: Lecturer, Creative Writing – Biography Melbourne University, Faculty of Arts, School of Culture and Communication (Retrieved 14 September 2007)
 McCulloch, A. (2006) The Casting of Shadows and the Finding of Form. Book review: Marion Campbell, Shadow Thief (Canberra: Pandanus Books, 2006), Southerly: a review of Australian literature, Vol 66, No 2, pp. 129–133, English Association, Sydney Branch, Australia.

Further reading
 (Interview)
 (Review of Konkretion.)

1948 births
Living people
Australian women novelists
20th-century Australian novelists
20th-century Australian women writers
Writers from Sydney
University of New South Wales alumni
University of Western Australia alumni
Victoria University, Melbourne alumni
Academic staff of Deakin University
University of Melbourne people